Lowhee Creek is a creek located in the Cariboo region of British Columbia. The creek was discovered in 1861 by Richard Willoughby who struck it rich here in 1861. He named it after a secret society at Yale University.  The creek was mined for gold and was productive in the 1860s. The richest ground was where the stream flows into the meadows. This creek has been worked using sluicing, drifting, and hydraulicking.

References

External links
 

Rivers of British Columbia
Cariboo Land District